The Twins Effect, also known as Vampire Effect in the United States, is a 2003 Hong Kong martial arts comedy-horror film directed by Dante Lam and Donnie Yen. The film was derived from Cantopop group Twins, starring both members Charlene Choi and Gillian Chung in the leading roles. Co-stars include Edison Chen and Ekin Cheng. Jackie Chan makes a cameo appearance as an ambulance driver.

Released on 8 March 2003, The Twins Effect was a box-office success in Hong Kong, became the highest-grossing domestic film of the year. The film gained huge popularity, mainly from fans of the Cantopop group Twins.

Plot
An evil vampire duke seeks to kill and collect the blood of a royal family of European vampires in order to become all powerful. The last surviving member of the family, Prince Kazaf, flees to Hong Kong with his servant Prada. There, they are introduced by estate agent Momoko to live in an abandoned church.

Vampire hunter Reeve is depressed after his partner Lila is killed by vampires. He decides to train Lila's younger sister, Gypsy, to inherit her sister's duty and fight the vampire duke. However, Reeve's own sister, Helen, sees Gypsy as a rival.

At the same time, Kazaf meets Helen and falls in love with her, after which he intends to lead the life of a human being, but he is tracked down by the duke. Helen helps Kazaf and lets him hide in her home, where they are later discovered by Gypsy. Meanwhile, Reeve falls into the duke's trap while hunting vampires. Helen and Gypsy team up to save him.

Cast

Charlene Choi as Helen
Gillian Chung as Gypsy
Ekin Cheng as Reeve
Edison Chen as Kazaf
Anthony Wong as Prada
Mandy Chiang as Momoko
Josie Ho as Lila
Maggie Lau as Nurse Maggie
Jackie Chan as Jackie Fong, the ambulance driver (cameo appearance) 
Karen Mok as Ivy
Chapman To as Ken
Mickey Hardt as Duke Dekotes
Cheung Tat-ming as Jackie's friend
Ricardo Mamood as Ethan
Winnie Leung as Deborah
Digger Mesch as Vampire Thomas
Marky Lee Campbell as Vampire Boz
Mark Strange as Vampire Smashing
Philip Chen as Vampire Lebrow
Daniel Whyte as Vampire Ice
Simon Robida as Vampire Zoolander
Daniel O'Neill as Vampire Dan
Bey Logan as Vampire John
Robert Meister as Vampire Elron
Michael Clements as Vampire Nobals
Don Ferguson as Vampire Train
Philip Ng as Ambulance Vampire (uncredited)
Matthew Sturgess as Vampire Food (uncredited)
Spencer Lam as Jackie's father
Matt Chow as Matt
Yumiko Cheng as a wedding guest
Victy Wong as a wedding guest
Ho Wai-yip as a wedding guest
Yeung Yung-lin as a wedding guest

Alternate version
After its release in Hong Kong, the film was renamed to Vampire Effect and some sequences were slightly altered. The new version was released in the United States in DVD as well.

The following are some differences between Vampire Effect and The Twins Effect:
Several scenes and timelines in the opening sequence are altered
Some scenes' editing are different
Some dialogues were modified
About 20 minutes of footage were cut from the original film, but some new scenes were added
The new film length is shorter than the original version (88 minutes for Vampire Effect)
Some film scores / music / instrumentals differ from the original version (different composer)

Release
The Twins Effect was released in Hong Kong on 8 March 2003. In the Philippines, the film was released on 21 January 2004.

Home media
There are five versions of DVD, along with VCD, released in Hong Kong:
DAY FOR NIGHT Limited Edition (Limited 3000 sets. 2 DVDs come with Special Packaging, Vampire Slayer's sword, 4 autograph photos and individual printed code on the cover sleeve)
DAY FOR NIGHT Limited Edition - 2nd Edition (2 DVDs comes with Bronze colour Special Packaging, Bronze colour Vampire Slayer's sword, and 4 autograph postcards)
First Press 2 DVDs with Metallic / Silver Cardboard Slipcase
Second Press 2 DVDs with Cardboard Slipcase and altered disc print
Standard DVD (no slipcase)
First Press VCD with Metallic / Silver Cardboard Slipcase
Second Press / standard VCD with Cardboard Slipcase

Accolades

See also
The Twins Effect II
Vampire film

References

External links

The Twins Effect at the Hong Kong Movie Database

The Twins Effect official Hong Kong website

2003 films
2003 martial arts films
2000s comedy horror films
2000s martial arts comedy films
2000s Cantonese-language films
Films directed by Dante Lam
Hong Kong comedy horror films
Hong Kong martial arts comedy films
Kung fu films
Martial arts horror films
Vampires in film
2000s Hong Kong films